HMS Douglas was an Admiralty type flotilla leader (also known as the Scott-class) of the British Royal Navy. Built by Cammell Laird, Douglas commissioned in 1918, just before the end of the First World War. During the Second World War, Douglas served with Force H out of Gibraltar and as a convoy escort. She was sold for scrap in March 1945.

Design and construction

In December 1916, the British Admiralty placed orders for two large flotilla leaders,  and Douglas from Cammell Laird as a follow on to the prototype of the class, which had been ordered in April that year. Design displacement was  normal and  full load.

Douglas main gun armament consisted of five 4.7 in (120 mm)/45 calibre BL Mark I guns, on CP VI mountings capable of elevating to 30 degrees. Anti-aircraft armament consisted of a single 3 inch (76 mm) 20 cwt gun. Torpedo armament consisted of six 21 inch (533 mm) torpedo tubes in two triple mounts.

Douglas was laid down at Cammell Laird's Birkenhead shipyard on 30 June 1917, launched on 8 June 1918 and commissioned on 30 August 1918.

Modifications
While Douglas had only limited modifications between the wars, an early change during the Second World War was the replacement of the amidships 4.7-inch gun by two 2-pounder (40 mm) "pom-pom" autocannon, with the aft funnel shortened to improve the field of fire for the 3 inch anti-aircraft gun. Three Oerlikon 20 mm cannon later supplemented the short-range anti-aircraft armament, while a further two Oerlikons finally replaced the 2-pounders. Radar (Type 286, later replaced by Type 290 and Type 271) was fitted during the war, as was HF/DF radio direction-finding gear.

Conversion to a short-range escort involved removal of two more 4.7 inch guns and a bank of torpedo tubes, with the forward gun replaced by a Hedgehog anti-submarine mortar, and the aft gun and tubes removed to allow a heavy depth charge armament of 70 charges.

Service history
On commissioning Douglas joined the 6th Destroyer Flotilla, part of the Dover Patrol, as leader. On 16 September 1918, Douglas boats helped to pick up survivors from the monitor , which was scuttled in Dover harbour following a magazine fire and explosion. In October, Douglas was employed escorting monitors off the Belgian coast, taking part in the bombardment of Ostend on 17 October 1918 and rescuing survivors from  when the monitor was mined and sunk off Ostend on 20 October. On 25 October that year Douglas transferred to the Grand Fleet, joining the 11th Destroyer Flotilla at Scapa Flow.

By March 1919, Douglas had moved to the 7th Destroyer Flotilla, but by May 1919, Douglas was in reserve at Rosyth. On 18 March 1920, Douglas recommissioned as leader for the 4th Destroyer Flotilla of the Atlantic Fleet. On 2 December, she was damaged by a collision at Queenstown in the south of Ireland, and was under repair at Pembroke Dock until 26 January 1921. Douglas reduced to reserve (with a reduced complement) on 26 June 1921, and was still laid up at Rosyth at the end of 1921. In March 1922, Douglas, still under reserve, moved to Devonport, and from June to November that year was employed testing cradles for new slipways at Pembroke, before returning to reserve at Devonport.

Douglas was refitted at Sheerness dockyard in January to March 1928, and then commissioned as leader of the 1st Submarine Flotilla of the Mediterranean Fleet, based at Malta on 7 April 1928. Douglas was again refitted at Sheerness from October 1933 to May 1934, where her boilers were retubed, before returning to the 1st Submarine Flotilla. Douglas was refitted at Malta in August 1935, and in September that year, as a result of the Abyssinia Crisis, reinforcing the 1st Destroyer Flotilla. In July 1936, following the outbreak of the Spanish Civil War, the Royal Navy sent ships to Spanish harbours to evacuate British subjects, with Douglas being one of several ships sent to Barcelona. Douglas returned to the 1st Destroyer Flotilla in September 1936, and remained part of that flotilla in March 1939. Douglas was refitted at Gibraltar from March to July 1939.

Second World War
In September 1939, at the start of the Second World War, Douglas was a member of the 13th Destroyer Flotilla, based at Gibraltar, having joined the flotilla on 22 August. A Saro London flying boat from Gibraltar-based No. 202 Squadron RAF alighted in an attempt to rescue survivors, but was unable to take-off again, and was towed back to Gibraltar by Douglas as she returned the survivors to land. On 21 January 1940, Douglas was escorting the Gibraltar bound convoy OG.15F off the coast of Portugal when she spotted a German submarine  and attacked. U-44 sustained only minor damage.

On 8 July 1940, Douglas sortied as part of the escort for Force H, which had left Gibraltar to act as a distraction while the British Mediterranean Fleet escorted two convoys between Malta and Alexandria. While the Mediterranean Fleet clashed briefly with Italian forces at the Battle of Calabria, Force H's movements caused Italian submarines, one of which sank the destroyer , to be redeployed away from the convoy, and attracted heavy air attacks. Later that month, Douglas returned to Britain, undergoing condenser repairs before joining to the Home Fleet, based at Scapa Flow, carrying out patrol duties, as well as escorting the fleet and minelaying operations. On 2 November, Douglas rescued twelve survivors from the naval trawler , which had been sunk by a mine on 31 October.

In February 1941, Douglas was transferred from the Home Fleet to Western Approaches Command, joining the 2nd Escort Group. On 28 April, Convoy HX 121 came under heavy U-boat attack, and the 2nd Escort Group, including Douglas, was detached from Convoy OB 314 to reinforce HX 121. Douglas then depth-charged and sunk the submarine . In all four ships were lost from HX 121, with one U-boat being sunk. On 11 September, the 2nd Escort Group, led by Commander W. E. Banks aboard Douglas, left Convoy ON 13F to reinforce Convoy SC 42 under heavy attack off the east coast of Greenland from the U-boats of the wolfpack Markgraf, which had sunk 15 ships from the convoy already.

On 15 January 1942, Douglas was part of the escort of Convoy ON 55 off Iceland in a severe storm (described as the worst seen in Iceland for 15 years), when the American destroyer , part of an American escort group attempting to relieve the 2nd Escort Group, collided with Douglas, badly damaging both ships, with one seaman lost from Douglas. After temporary repair by the depot ship  at Iceland and returning to the United Kingdom, it was decided to convert Douglas to a Short-Range Escort while she was under repair at Palmers in Jarrow. This involved reducing the ship's gun and torpedo armament to accommodate better anti-submarine weaponry.

Douglas was under repair and refit until April 1942, joining the Home Fleet in May. Douglas formed part of the ill-fated Arctic Convoy Convoy PQ 17, but left the convoy to join Convoy QP-13, which was returning from the Soviet Union at the same time as PQ 17 was sailing to the Soviet Union, on 2 July 1942, before PQ 17 had come under serious attack. Both California and Duchess of York were badly hit, with 46 killed aboard California and 27 aboard Duchess of York, and the blazing ships were sunk by the convoy's escorts early the next day after the survivors were rescued, in order to avoid the attentions of U-boats.

After dark, U-732 attempted to escape on the surface but was spotted by an aircraft. On being spotted, the commanding officer of U-732 ordered that the submarine be scuttled, but before the submarine sank, Douglas attacked with 10 more depth charges. Eighteen of U-732s crew were rescued, eight by Douglas, with 31 killed. Imperialist and Douglas were jointly credited with the sinking of U-732.

Douglas continued in use as a convoy escort until February 1945 when she was paid off into reserve. She was sold for scrap on 20 March 1945 to the British Iron & Steel Corporation (BISCO) who passed the ship on to TW Ward.

Notes

Citations

References
 
 
 
 
 
 
 
 
 
 
 

 

Ships built on the River Mersey
1918 ships
Admiralty type flotilla leaders